LG Chem Ltd. (Korean: LG화학), often referred to as LG Chemical, is the largest Korean chemical company and is headquartered in Seoul, South Korea. It was the 10th largest chemical company in the world by sales in 2017. It was first established as the Lucky Chemical Industrial Corporation, which manufactured cosmetics. It is now solely a business-to-business company (consumer products division was spun off into LG Household & Health Care).

The company has eight factories in South Korea and a network of 29 business locations in 15 countries. This network includes a holding company in China, 14 overseas manufacturing subsidiaries, five marketing subsidiaries, seven representative offices, and two R&D centers. The Financial Times reported on April 2, 2017, that LG Chem would be expanding battery production in China. At the time, China accounted for one-third of the company's total sales. In April 2019, LG Chem sued rival SK Innovation for allegedly stealing trade secrets for manufacturing electric vehicle batteries.

Business and product areas

Current
LG Chem has three main business areas:
 Petrochemicals
 Advanced materials
 Life sciences

Petrochemicals
LG Chem is a supplier of petrochemicals ranging from basic distillates to specialty polymers. For example, it is a large producer of common plastics such as  acrylonitrile butadiene styrene (ABS), styrene-acrylonitrile resin (SAN), and polyvinyl chloride (PVC). It also produces raw materials and liquids, including plasticizers, specialty additives, alcohols, polyolefins, acrylic acid, synthetic rubber, styrenics, performance polymers, engineering plastics, elastomers, conductive resins, and other chemicals.

Advanced materials
LG Chem supplies display and optical films, polarizers, printed circuit materials, and toners. It also supplies LCD polarizers, which are multi-layer sheets of film applied to the top and bottom surfaces of TFT-LCD panels to transmit the light from the backlight unit through the panel, and 3D FPR (film-type patterned retarder) film, which enables three-dimensional viewing.

Life sciences
LG Chem acquired AVEO Pharmaceuticals, a U.S. bio firm focused on renal cell carcinoma, for US$571 million in 2023.

Former

Energy solutions

LG Chem completed development and began mass production of Korea's first lithium-ion batteries back in 1999. At the end of 2011, LG Chem was the world's third-largest maker with an annual production capacity of 1 billion cells. It is also a supplier of automotive battery for electric vehicles, such as the Ford Focus, Chevrolet Volt and Renault ZOE.

LG Chem Michigan is a wholly owned subsidiary of LG Chem based in Holland, Michigan which operates a plant to manufacture advanced battery cells for electric vehicles. The  million Holland plant received 50% of its funding from U.S. Department of Energy matching stimulus funds, and started manufacturing battery systems in 2013. The plant can produce enough cells per year to build between 50,000 and 200,000 battery packs for electric cars and hybrids such as the Chevrolet Volt by General Motors, the Ford Focus Electric, and upcoming plug-in electric vehicles from other carmakers. Its research and development arm, called LG Chem Power, is based in nearby Troy, Michigan. LG Chem Power and LG Chem Michigan were originally one company called Compact Power, Inc.

Both the Chevrolet Volt and the Ford Focus Electric initially used cells manufactured in Korea by parent LG Chem and then later switched to cells produced in LG Chem Michigan's Holland plant once it opened.

In September 2020, LG Chem unveiled its plan to publicly list its energy division under the name of LG Energy Solution by December.

Accidents and incidents

Visakhapatnam gas leak

On 7 May 2020, a gas leak incident that took place at the LG Polymer plant at Gopalapatnam on the outskirts of Visakhapatnam resulted in the death of 12 people, hospitalization of over 300 and around thousands falling sick. Nearly 3000 people were evacuated from villages in five-kilometre radius of the plant. The gas reportedly started leaking around 2:30am when the workers were preparing to reopen the plant after the lockdown ordered due COVID-19 pandemic was relaxed in the region.

Seosan plant explosion
On 19 May 2020, an alkylaluminum-based catalyst powder exploded due to high-pressure while being transported at the packing room of the LG Chem plant at Seosan. The explosion exposed the pyrophoric powder to the air, causing a fire. As a result, a 39-year-old researcher died and two more workers suffered second-degree burns.

See also
 List of electric-vehicle-battery manufacturers
 VinFast

References

External links
 

Auto parts suppliers of South Korea
Chemical companies of South Korea
Electric vehicle battery manufacturers
Battery manufacturers
Solar energy companies
Silicon wafer producers
Multinational companies headquartered in South Korea
Technology companies of South Korea
LG Corporation
Companies listed on the Korea Exchange
Manufacturing companies based in Seoul
Chemical companies established in 1947
South Korean companies established in 1947
1960s initial public offerings